TRPP (transient receptor potential polycystic) is a family of transient receptor potential ion channels which when mutated can cause polycystic kidney disease.

Subcategories
TRPP subunits can be divided into two subcategories depending on structural similarity.

Polycystic Kidney Disease 1 (PKD1)-Like Group
The first group, polycystic kidney disease 1 (PKD1)-like, contains polycystin-1 (Previously known as TRPP1), PKDREJ, PKD1L1, PKD1L2, and PKD1L3. Polycystin-1 contains numerous N-terminal adhesive domains that are important for cell-cell contact. This group of subunits also contain a large extracellular domain with numerous polycystin motifs. These motifs are of unknown function and are located between the S6 and S7 segments. The large intracellular C-terminal segment of TRPP1 seems to interact with TRPP2 to act as a signaling complex.

Polycystic Kidney Disease 2 (PKD2)-Like Group
This group of TRPP members (previously known as TRPP2-like) are: TRPP1 (previously known as TRPP2 or PKD2), TRPP2 (previously known as TRPP3 or PKDL2), and TRPP3 (previously known as TRPP5 or polycystin-L2). Unlike the previous group, which contain 11 membrane-spanning segments, this group resemble other TRP channels, having 6 membrane-spanning segments with intracellular N- and C-termini. All of the members of this group contain a coiled coil region in their C-terminus involved in the interaction with the polycystin-1 group. TRPP1 and TRPP3 form constitutively active cation-selective ion channels that are permeable to calcium. TRPP2 has also been implicated in sour taste perception. Coupling of PKD1 and TRPP1 recruits TRPP1 to the membrane. Here, its activity is decreased and it suppresses the activation of G proteins by PKD1.

Genes
 Group 1: polycystic kidney disease 1 (PKD1) like proteins
 PKD1 
 
 
 
 
 Group 2: polycystic kidney disease 2 (PKD2) like proteins
 TRPP1 
 TRPP2 
 TRPP3

See also
 Polycystic kidney disease

References

External links
 
 
 

Membrane proteins
Ion channels